Gavin Andresen (Formerly known as Gavin Bell) is an American software developer known for his involvement with bitcoin. He is based in Amherst, Massachusetts.

Originally a developer of 3D graphics and virtual reality software, Andresen became involved in developing products for the bitcoin market in 2010, and was declared by Satoshi Nakamoto as the lead developer of the reference implementation for bitcoin client software after Satoshi Nakamoto announced his departure. In 2012 Andresen founded the Bitcoin Foundation to support and nurture the development of the bitcoin currency, and by 2014, left his software development role to concentrate on his work with the Foundation.

Career
Andresen (at the time Bell ) graduated from Princeton University in 1988.  He began his career working on 3D graphics software at Silicon Graphics Computer Systems. In 1996, he co-authored the VRML 2.0 specification, and later published a reference manual for VRML 2.0.

Since leaving Silicon Valley in 1996, Andresen has tackled a wide variety of software-related ventures, including CTO of an early Voice over IP  startup and co-founder of a company that made multiplayer online games for blind people and their sighted friends.

Bitcoin
Andresen was the lead developer for a part of the bitcoin digital currency project, working to create a secure, stable "cash for the Internet." Andresen discovered bitcoin in 2010, considering its design to be brilliant. Soon after he created a website named The Bitcoin Faucet which gave away bitcoin. In April 2011, Forbes quoted Andresen as saying, "Bitcoin is designed to bring us back to a decentralized currency of the people," and "this is like better gold than gold." After joining the developers contributing to Bitcoin along with Satoshi Nakamoto, he went on to become lead developer of the client software for the bitcoin network. He stepped back as lead maintainer in 2014.

Andresen also created ClearCoin, an escrow-type of service, which was closed on about June 23, 2011. After several years working on the software, Andresen left the role of lead developer of bitcoin to work on the strategic development of its technology. He conceived of the Bitcoin Foundation which became reality in 2012.

In May 2016 Andresen stated that the Australian programmer and entrepreneur Craig Wright was Nakamoto, but later expressed regret getting involved in the "'who was Satoshi' game" and stated "it was a mistake to trust Craig Wright."

Andresen has not contributed to Bitcoin since February 2016. He had become critical of the failure of bitcoin developers to increase network capacity, and helped put together Bitcoin XT as alternative software. His commit access to Bitcoin Core on GitHub was revoked in May 2016 after stating Wright was Satoshi Nakamoto. In November 2017, Andresen expressed support for rival currency Bitcoin Cash, stating "Bitcoin Cash is what I started working on in 2010".

References

People from Amherst, Massachusetts
People associated with Bitcoin
Princeton University alumni
Living people
People associated with cryptocurrency
American computer programmers
Year of birth missing (living people)
Place of birth missing (living people)